Wilfred "Will" Downing (born November 29, 1963) is an American singer and songwriter. He is married to singer Audrey Wheeler, who was a member of the R&B group Unlimited Touch.

Biography
Downing enrolled in Erasmus Hall High School in Brooklyn, New York. Alumni of the school include record label executives Clive Davis (who founded Arista Records), Kedar Massenburg (who later became president of Motown), Stephanie Mills and singer Barbra Streisand. Downing, who eventually recorded for Motown, graduated with Massenburg in the class of 1981. Downing then attended college at Virginia Union University in Richmond, Virginia. In the mid-1980s, he moved back to New York City, and worked on albums by Mariah Carey, The O'Jays, Billy Joel, Gerald Albright, Billy Ocean, Regina Belle, Rachelle Ferrell and Mica Paris. Later he sang with Arthur Baker's group, Wally 'Jump' Junior. Downing then used Baker as a producer after he signed with Island Records.

In 1988, Downing signed a recording contract with 4th & Broadway Records, and his first solo album, Will Downing, was released that same year. His version of the John Coltrane piece, "A Love Supreme", reached No. 4 on the Billboard Hot Dance Club Songs chart. Downing stayed with 4th & Broadway for just one album and switched to Island Records for his second release, Come Together as One (1989).  Switching labels to Mercury for his fourth outing, 1993's Love's the Place to Be, Downing scored his best-selling album to date with about 235,000 copies sold in the United States and over 300,000 copies in the UK. He remained with Mercury for two more albums, Moods in 1995 and Invitation Only in 1997, both of which sold well. All the Man You Need received a Grammy Award nomination for Best Traditional R&B Album in 2000. The album included "When You Need Me", a duet single with Chante Moore. In 2002, Downing received the International Association of African-American Music Diamond Award.

In December 2006, Downing suffered from polymyositis. Despite the debilitating aspects of the disease, he worked towards releasing a new album in 2010. Love, Lust, & Lies: An Audio Novel was released in September that year. Beyond performing, Downing is a spokesperson for the American Stroke Association. On tour, he conducts the charity bowling event, Strike Against Stroke, to raise funds towards awareness and education in the African American community, which is disproportionately affected. The American Heart Association recognized Downing for his efforts, honoring him as a Celebrity Ambassador. He is also a keen photographer, and self-published the 2005 coffee table book Unveiled Series I. He is a member of Omega Psi Phi fraternity. He has three children (Will Jr., Aron Siobhan & Aja)

Discography

Studio albums

EPs
 2021: The Song Garden

Compilations

Singles

References

External links
Will Downing official website
Interview with Ability Magazine
Will Downing talks about his Pieces CD in Soul Express

1963 births
Musicians from Brooklyn
American baritones
American contemporary R&B singers
Smooth jazz singers
Virginia Union University alumni
Living people
Island Records artists
Verve Records artists
Mercury Records artists
Motown artists
Erasmus Hall High School alumni
American neo soul singers
Ballad musicians
American male jazz musicians
21st-century African-American male singers
20th-century African-American male singers